The intertarsal joint are the joints of the tarsal bones in the foot. There are seven specific inter tarsal joints (articulations) in the human foot:
 Subtalar joint
 Talocalcaneonavicular joint
 Calcaneocuboid joint
 Cuneonavicular joint
 Cuboideonavicular joint
 Intercuneiform joints 

Foot
Joints
Lower limb anatomy